Jonathan "Jonny" William C. Searle  (born 8 May 1969) is a British rower and business man. Along with his brother Gregory, and coxswain Garry Herbert, Searle won the gold medal in the coxed pair event at the Olympic Games in Barcelona.

Early life and education
Searle was born in Walton-on-Thames, Surrey.  He was educated at Hampton School and Christ Church, Oxford.

Whilst at Oxford University, he competed in the Boat Race in 1988, 1989, and 1990. Oxford triumphed in all three races. Searle was President of the Oxford University Boat Club in the 1989–1990 academic year.

Career

Searle is an Olympic gold medalist, winning the coxed pairs event at the 1992 Barcelona Olympics with his brother Greg Searle. He also won a World Championships gold medal in 1993. In the 1996 Atlanta Olympics, he finished third in the coxless four event.

He is a steward of Henley Royal Regatta.

Personal life

Searle has two sons, Kit and Jake.

He still trains at Molesey Boat Club.

References 

 

1969 births
Living people
English male rowers
English Olympic medallists
People educated at Hampton School
Alumni of Christ Church, Oxford
Members of the Order of the British Empire
Olympic rowers of Great Britain
Rowers at the 1992 Summer Olympics
Rowers at the 1996 Summer Olympics
Stewards of Henley Royal Regatta
Olympic gold medallists for Great Britain
Olympic bronze medallists for Great Britain
Oxford University Boat Club rowers
Olympic medalists in rowing
World Rowing Championships medalists for Great Britain
Medalists at the 1996 Summer Olympics
Medalists at the 1992 Summer Olympics